Alan John Woods  (30 March 1930 – 13 January 1990) was a senior Australian public servant.

Life and career
Woods was born in Woonona, New South Wales on 30 March 1930 to parents Oswald and Gladys May Woods. After attending St Joseph's College, Hunters Hill on a scholarship, he obtained a Bachelor of Economics from the University of Sydney in 1955 while working as an executive trainee for Dunlop Rubber Australia Ltd.

Woods began his Commonwealth Public Sector career at the Commonwealth Public Service Board in Sydney in 1955. He moved to Canberra in 1957, taking a research officer post in the Department of Territories.

In December 1977, Woods was appointed Secretary of the Department of National Development (later abolished and replaced by the Department of National Development and Energy, and then the Department of Resources and Energy).

Woods was appointed Secretary of the Department of Defence in 1986, but was replaced in a reshuffle of department heads in mid-1988.

Awards and recognition 
Woods was made an Officer of the Order of Australia in the 1985 Australia Day Honours for "public service, particularly as Secretary to the Department of Resources and Energy". In the 1989 Australia Day Honours he was promoted to Companion of the Order of Australia "for public service, particularly as Secretary to the Department of Defence".

Death
Woods became ill with cancer in the later part of 1989. He died of the disease on 13 January 1990 in Canberra.

Notes

References and further reading

1930 births
1990 deaths
Australian public servants
Deaths from cancer in the Australian Capital Territory
Companions of the Order of Australia
Secretaries of the Australian Department of Defence
People educated at St Joseph's College, Hunters Hill
University of Sydney alumni